Theta Hydrae, Latinized from θ Hydrae, is a binary star system in the constellation Hydra. It is visible to the naked eye with an apparent visual magnitude of 3.9.

The primary component of this system is a B-type main sequence star with a stellar classification of B9.5 V. It is a candidate Lambda Boötis star, indicating it displays an underabundance of iron peak elements. However, it is also underabundant in oxygen, a characteristic not shared by other Lambda Boötis stars. Instead, it may be a peculiar B star.

An orbiting white dwarf companion was discovered in 1998 from its X-ray emission. This degenerate star must have evolved from a progenitor that was once more massive than the current primary. Burleigh and Barstow (1999) gave a mass estimate of 0.68 times the mass of the Sun, whereas Holberg  et al. (2013) put it as high as 1.21 times the Sun's mass. The latter would put it beyond the theoretical upper limit for white dwarf remnants of typical single stars that did not undergo a merger or mass loss.

References

External links

B-type main-sequence stars
Spectroscopic binaries
White dwarfs
Hydra (constellation)
Hydrae, Theta
Durchmusterung objects
Hydrae, 22
079469
045336
3665
Lambda Boötis stars